Grant Township is a township in Pocahontas County, Iowa, USA.

History
Grant Township was established in 1870. It is named for President Ulysses S. Grant.

References

Townships in Pocahontas County, Iowa
Townships in Iowa